The Healthcare Businesswomen's Association (HBA) was founded in 1977 as a global non-profit organization dedicated to furthering the advancement of women in healthcare worldwide.

Organizational structure

The current interim CEO of the HBA is Wendy White.

Press
The HBA has been featured on CIO.com, Associations Now magazine, BlogTalkRadio, and the PharmaVOICE Podcast.

References

External links
Official site

Professional associations based in the United States
Organizations established in 1977